Mbola may refer to:
Mbola, Cameroon, a village in the Centre Province of Cameroon
Mbola, Tanzania, a cluster of Millennium Villages in the Uyui district of Tanzania
Emmanuel Mbola, a Zambian international footballer
Lola Mbola, fictional female character in Robotboy
Mbule language, a southern Bantoid language spoken by a few people in central Cameroon
Mbole people, an ethnic group living in the Orientale Province, Democratic Republic of the Congo